The Yirandhali are an indigenous Australian people, who lived in the area of the present day Shire of Flinders in the state of Queensland.

Language
Yirandhali may possibly. according to Robert Dixon, belong to the Maric branch of the Pama–Nyungan language family.

According to Peter Sutton, the list of words given by an early settler, M. Armstrong of the language of the Upper Cape River, which Tindale ascribes to the Yilba, actually refers to the Yirandhali language.

Country
The heartland of their country lay west of the Great Dividing Range, around the upper Dutton and Flinders rivers and stretched from near Mount Sturgeon southwards as far as Caledonia. Their western limits lay close to Richmond, Corfield, and the area east of Winton. The Yirandhali were the indigenous peoples of Torrens, Tower Hill, and Landsborough Creeks, of Lammermoor, Hughenden and Tangorin.

Watering on Yirandhali territory was in good part based on the resources of Towerhill Creek, which, running south, provided 12 'reaches' or watering holes: Pilmunny, Beroota, Marrikanna, Narrkooroo, Narkool, Newjenna, Turrummina, Mattamundukka, Teekalamungga, Teekaloonda, Kooroorinya, and Bogunda,. The wells had been dug, maintained and kept in good repair by the tribe 'since time immemorial'.

Social organization
The Yirandhali marriage system recognized 4 classes:
 Ko-bro.
 Woonggo.
 Bunberry.
 Koorookill.

History of contact
Yirandhali lands were expropriated for running sheep and cattle, after the Scottish immigrant William Landsborough passed through their land.  Our main informant for the earliest period is Robert Christison who took up an extensive tract of land for pastoral purposes between the Landsborough and Thomson rivers, reckoned their numbers at about 300. The editor of his papers, and his biographer, his daughter Mary Montgomerie Bennett, writing in 1927 states however that when Christison took up the Yirandhali lands in 1863, they numbered 500. His daughter describes his first contact in the following terms:
One day, with Gailbury, overtaking some blacks, he chose a fine-looking young fellow and rode after him, heading him back from the scrub that he was making for to the open plain. In desperation the black fellow ran up a tree. Christison dismounted and signed to him to come down, else he would cut down the tree. Thereupon the black fellow sprang to the ground and threw his arms round the horse's neck, supplicating the terrified animal that snorted and backed, broke the reins, and galloped off. Christison had a difficult task to hold the black fellow, for he was very strong, with muscle like whipcord, slippery with emu oil, and wriggled like an eel. However, he secured the black fellow and brought him home and chained him to a verandah post. He fed him, gave him a blanket, taught him to smoke, and succeeded in convincing him of his friendly intentions, while he picked up what he could of the black fellow's language and learnt the name of the tribe-Dalleburra-and of the black fellow - Ko-bro.'

In Dr. J. Beddoe's account, Christison was, uncharacteristically, for the time, much impressed by the capacities and intelligence of the people on whose lands he established his station:-
Within a few years of his settlement on the lands he occupies, where he was the earliest European invader, he succeeded in establishing friendly relations with a tribe who had dwelt there, called Dalleyburra.. and by a judicious mixture of firmness, justice and kindness, established himself as their ruler. Considerable numbers of them have been employed since then, in tending herds, sheep and cattle, in sheep-washing, bark-stripping, timber- cutting, and various other occupations.
Beddoe, Christison's brother-in-law, reports from Christison that they were incentivized to work in order to obtain tobacco, consumption of which may therefore be 'morally beneficial.' He claims that there was also a rapid drop in their use of their native language as they adopted a variety of English, the result of mixing with the kanaka workforce which had been imported to help take on the main burden of working the station. This is contradicted by Christison's own daughter.  Christison was amazed at their rapid capacity to master languages, but, his daughter adds, even after decades, they would normally converse at length only in Dalleburra, rather than the pidgin.

His daughter's account leaves little doubt that Christison greatly admired the Yirandhali, whose peaceful character, loyalty to their overlord, and humanity to the old moved him deeply. Beddoe asserted that they were unusually susceptible to the effects of thirst. Marie Bennett is skeptical of the claim, stating that her father always admired their powers of endurance under harsh conditions. With regard to the elderly, citing several cases of deep care he had had occasion to observe: a girl crippled from birth was seen, then aged 60, being born by groups of the tribe, taking turns, on a litter; another 'a fragile useless old woman,' was on the point of drowning, when she was saved by several men plunging into a swollen river, or a mother watching over her sick child for several days while abstaining from food and drink, and refusing any consolation when it died.

Mythology
According to Christison, the Yirandhali believed the landscape was also occupied by spirits (yarrabi), the most feared of which was one, Koonkoolmujja, who haunted the rocky areas. Another kind, Korribberum,  would roam the downs, scrambling along on four legs, but hospitable to those whom he might encounter.

Alternative names
 Yerrundulli.
 Yerrunthully.
 Irendely.
 Dalebura, Dalleyburra.
 Pooroga. (language name).

Some words
  (tame dog)
  (whiteman)
  (father)
  (mother)
  (a duelling knife, fashioned from a quartz blade in a mortised ironbark hilt and fixed with a mix of beefwood gum, bees' wax and kangaroo sinews.)
  (initiated male)

Notes

Citations

Sources

Aboriginal peoples of Queensland